Glen Phillips (born December 29, 1970) is an American songwriter, lyricist, singer and guitarist.   He is best known as the singer and songwriter of the alternative rock group Toad the Wet Sprocket.  Phillips also records and performs as a solo artist.

Personal life

Phillips was born to a Reform Jewish family in Santa Barbara, California, United States. His father was a college professor who taught physics. Although his family was Jewish, with Glen having a Bar Mitzvah, his family was secular and Buddhism was studied, with this spiritual curiosity being present in his work.

As a child, he and his brother would listen to bands such as The Beatles and The Wall. He was a part of choir and theatre in high school. He originally envisioned becoming a teacher. He began to make music at 14 years old. Phillips took the California High School Proficiency Exam so he could graduate early. Phillips and his ex-wife, Laurel, whom he was married to from 1989 to 2014, have three daughters, Sophia, Freya, and Zola.

On October 8, 2008, Phillips injured his arm while at a friend's house when a glass coffee table collapsed while he was sitting on it. Phillips had surgery to repair a damaged ulnar nerve and muscle in his left arm. His ability to play guitar was hampered during his recovery, but he had been actively touring in spite of his injury. Sean Watkins and Jonathan Kingham recently joined Phillips on the road to provide accompaniment.

Phillips is frequently barefoot when performing with the band.

Music

Phillips began Toad the Wet Sprocket in 1986, at the age of 15.  By 1988, they had signed with Columbia Records.  They recorded five albums and many major tours until their 1998 breakup.

During his time in Toad the Wet Sprocket, Phillips was involved in a pop rock project called Flapping, Flapping.

Three years after Toad the Wet Sprocket's initial breakup, Phillips released his first solo album, Abulum, which was a change from the sound that characterized Toad the Wet Sprocket's material. This was followed up by a self-released live album and solo touring, along with a reunion tour with his former Toad bandmates.

In 2004, Phillips released a long-awaited collaboration with Nickel Creek, under the name Mutual Admiration Society.  The self-titled album had been recorded in 2000 and featured songs written by both Phillips alone and as collaborative efforts, and was released on Sugar Hill Records.

In 2005, Phillips returned to a major label via Universal Records' imprint Lost Highway Records and released the critically acclaimed Winter Pays For Summer.  The album included the radio single "Duck and Cover," but Phillips and the label would part ways due to creative differences. A compilation of six outtakes from the album were published as an EP titled Unlucky 7, the first track ("The Hole") of which was featured in the second episode of the AMC television series Breaking Bad.

Phillips released his third proper solo album, Mr. Lemons in the spring of 2006.  The music video for the album's first single, "Everything But You," made its debut as a Yahoo! Exclusive Premiere on May 11, 2006.

In 2007 Phillips reunited with Sara Watkins and Sean Watkins of Nickel Creek as well as Grant-Lee Phillips and Luke Bulla to perform as part of The Various & Sundry Tour.

In January 2008, Phillips released an EP Secrets of the New Explorers, with music influenced by Talk Talk and Peter Gabriel.

In January 2008, it was reported by Billboard that a new supergroup octet had formed.  The genesis of the project came via a "Glen Phillips and Friends" evening hosted by the Sings Like Hell concert series at Santa Barbara's Lobero Theatre in February 2007.  The ensemble reunited in Jim Scott's recording studio a year later and by September 2008 the collective settled upon the name Works Progress Administration (W.P.A.). In its octet configuration, WPA features Phillips, Sean Watkins (guitar), his sister Sara Watkins (fiddle), Benmont Tench (piano), Luke Bulla (fiddle), Greg Leisz (various), Pete Thomas (drums), and Davey Faragher (bass). The group also performs as a quintet featuring Phillips, Watkins, Bulla, and bassist Sebastian Steinberg. The results of the 2008 recording sessions were released as this album on September 15, 2009.

Phillips has also completed an album with Neilson Hubbard and Garrison Starr under the band name, Plover, released October 23, 2008.

In 2009, Phillips was involved in the soundtrack of the film Imagine That. He covers The Beatles' song "I'll Follow the Sun."

On April 5, 2018, Glen Phillips announced that he had signed with Compass Records Group. His 2016 album, Swallowed By the New, was re-released on May 4, 2018, with a new bonus track "Nobody's Gonna Get Hurt".

Discography

Studio albums
 Abulum (2000, independent; 2001, Brick Red Records)
 Winter Pays for Summer (2005, Lost Highway/Universal Records)
 Unlucky 7 (2006, independent)
 Mr. Lemons (2006, Umami/bigHelium)
 Secrets of the New Explorers (2008, independent)
 Tornillo (2010, independent) – recorded in 2002 with producer David Garza but scrapped in favor of making "Winter Pays For Summer" with John Fields. made available for download in 2010 as a Christmas gift for fans that had been asking about the sessions for years
 Coyote Sessions (2012, independent) – compilation of previously unreleased songs, recorded live in studio with one central microphone
 Options – B-sides & Demos (2014, Umami Music) – primarily outtakes from the 2003–2004 "Winter Pays For Summer" with some older demos thrown in
 Swallowed by the New (2016, Umami; 2018, Compass Records)
 There Is So Much Here (2022, Compass)

Other releases
 Live at Largo (2003, independent)
 Connect Sets (2005) – recorded live in studio to support Winter Pays for Summer
 Live at the Belly Up (2016, Belly Up Live)

With Toad The Wet Sprocket
 Bread & Circus (1988)
 Pale (1990)
 fear (1991)
 Dulcinea (1994)
 In Light Syrup (1995)
 Coil (1997)
 New Constellation (2013)
 The Architect of the Ruin (2015)
 Starting Now (2021)

With flapping, Flapping
 Montgomery Street (1996)

With Mutual Admiration Society
 Mutual Admiration Society (2004)

With Plover
 Plover (2008)

With RemoteTreeChildren
 Veteran of the Loudness Wars (2008)

With Works Progress Administration
 WPA (2009)

Music videos

 "Everything But You" – Mr. Lemons
 "Amnesty" – Swallowed By the New
 "Leaving Oldtown" – Swallowed By the New
 "Go" – Swallowed By the New
 "Nobody's Gonna Get Hurt" - Swallowed By the New
 "I Was a Riot" - There Is So Much Here

References

External links
 PopGurls 20 Questions with Glen Phillips. Interview from 2003.
 PARADIGM interview with Glen Phillips
 Glen Phillips on YouTube.com
 Glen Phillips JBTV 
 2010 Half-Hour TV Interview on The Creative Community

1970 births
Living people
Musicians from Santa Barbara, California
Jewish American songwriters
Jewish rock musicians
Jewish singers
American rock songwriters
American rock singers
American male singer-songwriters
American lyricists
Singer-songwriters from California
Toad the Wet Sprocket members
Lost Highway Records artists
21st-century American singers
21st-century American male singers
Works Progress Administration (band) members
21st-century American Jews